Autruche is a commune in the Ardennes department in the Grand Est region of northern France.

The inhabitants of the commune are known as Autruchiens or Autruchiennes.

Geography
Autruche is located some 43 km east by south-east of Rethel and 20 km north-east of Vouziers. Access to the commune is by the D947 from Germont in the south-west which passes through the southern corner of the commune and continues east to Bar-lès-Buzancy. The D12 also comes from Authe in the north-west and joins the D947 in the commune. Access to the village is by a local road branching from the D947 which goes north to the village. The commune is entirely farmland except for some lakes in the south.

The Bar river  forms the southern border of the commune as it flows west then follows the Canal des Ardennes to eventually join the Meuse at Vrigne-Meuse. The Ruisseau de Saint Pierremont flows from the north of the commune towards the south-west and continues to join the Bar west of the commune. The Ruisseau du Clageot rises in the north of the commune and flows south-west down the centre of the commune and also joins the Bar on the southern border.

Neighbouring communes and villages

Heraldry

Administration

List of Successive Mayors

Demography
In 2017 the commune had 69 inhabitants.

Sites and monuments
The Church of Saint-Nicolas (16th century) is registered as an historical monument. The church contains two items that are registered as historical objects:
6 Statuettes (17th century)
A Sculpture: Triumphant Virgin (17th century)

See also
Communes of the Ardennes department

References

External links
Autruche on the old IGN website 
Autruche on Géoportail, National Geographic Institute (IGN) website 
Autruche on the 1750 Cassini Map

Communes of Ardennes (department)